Modeste Eta (born 3 February 1981) is a Congolese footballer. He played in six matches for the Congo national football team in 1999 and 2000. He was also named in Congo's squad for the 2000 African Cup of Nations tournament.

References

1981 births
Living people
Republic of the Congo footballers
Republic of the Congo international footballers
2000 African Cup of Nations players
Place of birth missing (living people)
Association football forwards
TP Mystère players